Nestory Irankunda (born 9 February 2006) is a professional footballer who plays as a winger for Adelaide United in the A-League. In March 2023 he was selected to play for the Australian national team, the Socceroos.

Early life
Nestory Irankunda was born on 9 February 2006 in Tanzania.

He played junior football at Adelaide Croatia Raiders SC.

Club career 
Irankunda started his career playing in the youth levels of Adelaide United's NPL side in 2021, at the age of 15. In the youth team, he scored three goals in 15 appearances in the local National Premier League, and in Reserves scored seven goals in 13 games.

He made his A-League debut in the Original Rivalry clash against Melbourne Victory on 8 January 2022, coming on in the 71st minute for Bernardo. He made 13 appearances for Adelaide United in the 2021-22 season, scoring three goals including his first A-League goal as a free kick against the Newcastle Jets. , he had made 14 appearances for Adelaide United in the 2022-23 season, scoring four goals, which makes him at this date Adelaide United's tied third-top league scorer.

International career 
Irankunda is eligible to represent Tanzania, Burundi or Australia at international level. 

He has represented the Australia U17 national team at international level. 

On 14 March 2023, after strong performances coming on as a substitute for Adelaide, Irankunda was named as a "train-on" player for the Socceroos camp for friendlies against Ecuador.

Honours
Individual
A-Leagues All Star: 2022

References

External links
 Nestor Irankunda at Soccerway

2006 births
Living people
People from Kigoma Region
Tanzanian emigrants to Australia
Naturalised citizens of Australia
Australian soccer players
Association football midfielders
Adelaide Raiders SC players
Adelaide United FC players
National Premier Leagues players
A-League Men players